John Oliver Henderson (November 13, 1909 – February 19, 1974) was a United States district judge of the United States District Court for the Western District of New York from 1959 to 1974 and its Chief Judge from 1967 to 1974.

Education and career

Born in Buffalo, New York, Henderson received a Bachelor of Laws from the University of Buffalo Law School in 1933. He was in the United States Army during World War II, from 1942 to 1946, achieving the rank of lieutenant colonel. He returned to private practice in Buffalo, and was a clerk of the Surrogate Court of Erie County, New York from 1947 to 1948. He was the United States Attorney for the Western District of New York from 1953 to 1959.

Federal judicial service

On August 21, 1959, Henderson was nominated by President Dwight D. Eisenhower to a seat on the United States District Court for the Western District of New York vacated by Judge Justin C. Morgan. Henderson was confirmed by the United States Senate on September 14, 1959, and received his commission on September 21, 1959. He served as Chief Judge from 1967 until his death on February 19, 1974.

References

Sources
 

1909 births
1974 deaths
United States Attorneys for the Western District of New York
Judges of the United States District Court for the Western District of New York
United States district court judges appointed by Dwight D. Eisenhower
20th-century American judges
United States Army officers
20th-century American lawyers